Jordão River may refer to:

Brazil
 Jordão River (Acre)
 Jordão River (Paraná)

See also 
Jordão (disambiguation)
Jordan River (disambiguation)